This is a list of the earliest known English cricketers whose careers began prior to the first matches which are now considered to hold first-class status in 1772. The list is by season, this being the season in which the player's name first appears in sources.

Cricket underwent radical changes during the 18th century. Patronage and popular support enabled it to outgrow its roots as a village pastime and develop into a major sport. The Laws of Cricket were first written in 1744 and revised in 1774, and in the early 1760s pitched delivery bowling was introduced which necessitated the invention of the straight cricket bat: an evolution in bowling and batting techniques that radically changed cricket.

The earliest known scorecards date from 1744, but it was not until 1772 that they began to be completed and preserved on a regular basis.

Cricketers

To 1725

Many of the surviving records regarding cricket in the 17th century are from court cases. These include some of the names of people known to have played cricket. For example in a court case held at Guildford in 1598, John Derrick recalled playing cricket on a particular parcel of land when he was a pupil at the Royal Grammar School, Guildford  fifty years earlier, whilst in 1611 Bartholomew Wyatt and Richard Latter of Sidlesham in Sussex were both prosecuted for "breaking the Sabbath" by playing cricket on a Sunday. The earliest known reference to cricket in London in 1617 concerns Oliver Cromwell, the future Lord Protector, who played the game there whilst training at the Inns of Court.

A 1624 case records that Jasper Vinall of West Hoathly in  Sussex died as the result of an injury during a game, caused by a blow on the head from Edward Tye's bat. He is the sport's earliest known fatality. Further court cases throughout the 17th century record the names of those prosecuted for breaking the sabbath, involved in tithe disputes or in disputes over unpaid wagers.

Sir Robert Paston mentioned in a letter that he had been "cricketting" on Richmond Green in 1666, whilst at around the same time John Churchill, 1st Duke of Marlborough had played cricket whilst a pupil at St Paul's School, London. A reference in 1676 records Henry Tonge playing cricket at the British Mission in Aleppo, Turkey, the earliest known record of cricket being played outside England.

By the beginning of the 18th century, records of the names of cricketers begin to emerge.

1726 to 1750

The first scorecards to have survived date from the 1744 season. These record the names of each player involved in matches between London and a combined Surrey and Sussex side and those who played in a match between an England XI and a Kent side, which is the first match for which methods of dismissal are known. Both matches took place at the Artillery Ground in London in June.

1751 to 1771

The period between 1751 and 1771 saw the emergence of the Hambledon Club in Hampshire in around 1767 as an important centre of the game following "the decline in importance" of the Artillery Ground in London. It saw the scoring of the first known century by John Minshull in 1769, by which time scores, which had previously been kept on tally sticks, had begun to be written down more frequently.

The first full scorecards since the match between Kent and England in 1744, date from the 1772 season. These are now generally considered to be the first matches to have first-class cricket status.

See also
 List of English cricketers (1772–1786)
 List of English cricketers (1787–1825)
 List of English cricketers (1826–1840)
 List of English cricketers (1841–1850)
 List of English cricketers (1851–1860)
 List of English cricketers (1861–1870)

Notes

References

Bibliography
 
 Ashley-Cooper, F. S. (1900) At the Sign of the Wicket: Cricket 1742–1751, Cricket. (Available online at The Association of Cricket Statisticians and Historians. Retrieved 2023-01-15.)
 
 
 
 
 
  (Available online at the HathiTrust. Retrieved 2023-01-14.)
 
 
 
 
 
 
 

1786

early English